The 1882 Australia v England series was at the time considered to be part of another first-class cricket tour of England, by a combined team from the Australian colonies, but the match arranged between the Australians and an England side was later accepted to be a Test match. Although it was not known at the time, the one-off match played at The Oval in south London would become the birth of the Ashes.

The English side had lost the previous tour to Australia, but had remained undefeated at home by visiting Australian sides. Australian victory for the first time in England was widely condemned in the English press, including the publication of a satirical obituary which stated that English cricket had died, and the body will be cremated and the ashes taken to Australia. The English media then dubbed the next English tour to Australia in 1882–83 as the quest to regain The Ashes.

Despite the Australia v England match later receiving Test status, and being the match that triggered the birth of The Ashes, the 1882 match is not considered to be part of The Ashes since it precedes the introduction of the trophy.

Squads

Test series

Only Test

Day one
Billy Murdoch won the toss for Australia and chose to bat first. The decision proved a poor one though, as Australia were easily skittled out for a meagre 63 in 80 overs, taking just over 2 hours. The captain himself tried to offer resistance with a slow defensive 13, and experienced wicket-keeper/batsman Jack Blackham top-scored with 17, but the only other batsman to reach double-figures was Tom Garrett with 10. Inspired bowling from opening bowler Ted Peate who took 4 for 31, and Dick Barlow who produced a devastating 5 for 19, ripped the Australian batting order apart on a greenish wicket that gave more assistance that it first seemed.

England began their run chase with openers Dick Barlow and WG Grace, but 'The Doctor' was unable to reproduce his usual heroics, clean bowled by the express pace of Fred Spofforth for 4. A steady succession of wickets followed with only George Ulyett (26 off 59 balls) and Maurice Read (19 off 54 balls) providing any real resistance as Spofforth's pure pace provided too much firepower for the England line-up to deal with. He collected 7 for 46 off 36.3 overs including an astonishing 18 maidens. Four of his seven dismissals were clean bowled. Despite Spofforth's excellent bowling, England had established a first-innings lead of 38, being all out for 101. Stumps were called at the end of England's first innings.

Day two
The second day began with Australia beginning their second innings. The opening pair of Alick Bannerman and Hugh Massie fared much better than in the first innings, putting on 66 for the first wicket – more than the whole team's total in the first innings. The loss of Massie triggered a mini-collapse with Australia losing 4 for 13 over the next few overs before captain Billy Murdoch added a much-needed 29, but the last four wickets then fell for eight runs. Bannerman was top scorer with a well made 55, and Australia were all out for 122 in 63 overs, an overall lead of 84.

The Australians were greatly demoralised by the manner of their second-innings collapse, but fast bowler Fred Spofforth, spurred on by some gamesmanship on the part of his opponents, refused to give in. "This thing can be done," he declared. Already on a high from his career best 7 for 46 in the first innings, he set about the destruction of England in the second.

England had reached 15 when Spofforth clean bowled England captain Albert Hornby for 9. He removed Dick Barlow also clean bowled the very next ball to find himself on a hat-trick. W G Grace and George Ulyett then put together a partnership of 36 before Spofforth had Ulyett caught behind for 11. Grace fell two runs later, caught by Bannerman off the bowling of Harry Boyle for 32. England were stuttering at 53 for 4, still needing 31 more for victory.

A sluggish 12 off 55 balls from wicket-keeper Alfred Lyttelton took England on to 66 for 5, but he then had his middle-stump dramatically uprooted by Spofforth. Steel was caught and bowled by Spofforth for a third-ball duck, and Read was clean bowled for a second-ball duck in the same over. When Lucas was likewise bowled by Spofforth for 5, England were 75 for 8, needing just 10 more runs for victory, but with just two wickets remaining.

The tension was unbearable; contemporary accounts famously report that one spectator dropped dead and another gnawed through the handle of his umbrella. The very next over from the other end, Harry Boyle removed Barnes for 2 and then, with the last ball of his over, clean bowled Ted Peate for 2 to have England all out for 77 off exactly 55 overs.

England's innings had lasted a mere 122 minutes, destroyed by the pace of Spofforth, who bettered his first innings career best by two runs, collecting 7 for 44, to give him match figures of 14 for 90, both of which would remain his finest figures. Spofforth's performance included a burst of four wickets for only two runs to leave England just seven runs short of victory in one of the closest and most nail-biting finishes in the history of cricket.

At first the crowd fell deathly silent, unable to fathom how England had collapsed so dramatically. Then as the fine bowling display sank in, they rushed onto the field to congratulate Spofforth and Boyle for their remarkable achievement.

Post match 
England's astonishing collapse had shocked the English public, and the press savaged the players. It was the first time England had been beaten in England.
On 31 August, in the great Charles Alcock-edited magazine Cricket: A Weekly Record of The Game, there appeared a now-obscure mock obituary:

SACRED TO THE MEMORY
OF
ENGLAND'S SUPREMACY IN THE
CRICKET-FIELD
WHICH EXPIRED
ON THE 29TH DAY OF AUGUST, AT THE OVAL
----
"ITS END WAS PEATE"
----

Two days later, on 2 September, a second, more celebrated mock obituary, written by Reginald Brooks under the pseudonym "Bloobs", appeared in The Sporting Times. It read as follows:

In Affectionate Remembrance
of
ENGLISH CRICKET,
which died at the Oval
on
29 August 1882,
Deeply lamented by a large circle of sorrowing
friends and acquaintances
----
R.I.P.
----
N.B. – The body will be cremated and the
ashes taken to Australia.

Ivo Bligh fastened onto this notice and promised that, on the tour to Australia in 1882–83 (which he was to captain), he would regain "those ashes". He spoke of them again several times over the course of the tour, and the Australian media quickly caught on. The three-match series resulted in a two-one win to England, notwithstanding a fourth match, won by the Australians, whose status remains a matter of ardent dispute.

In the twenty years following Bligh's campaign, the term "The Ashes" largely disappeared from public use. There is no indication that this was the accepted name for the series—at least not in England. The term became popular again in Australia first, when George Giffen, in his memoirs (With Bat and Ball, 1899), used the term as if it were well known.

The true and global revitalisation of interest in the concept dates from 1903, when Pelham Warner took a team to Australia with the promise that he would regain "the ashes". As had been the case on Bligh's tour twenty years before, the Australian media latched fervently onto the term, and, this time, it stuck.

Records

Individual records

Team records

References

External links

1882 in Australian cricket
1882 in English cricket
1882
English cricket seasons in the 19th century
International cricket competitions from 1844 to 1888
1882